Henry Halloran was an Australian poet and civil servant who was born in Cape Town, South Africa on 6 April 1811.

Early life 
Henry Halloran was born on 6 April 1811, at Cape Town, South Africa, to Laurence Hynes Halloran and Lydia Anne, née Hall. After living in England for some years, he arrived in Sydney, New South Wales, in 1822 with his mother where they were reunited with his father. He was educated at his father's school before starting his career as a clerk in the NSW Public Service.

Career as Public Servant 
Halloran became a clerk in the Survey Department in 1827, later becoming chief clerk. In 1859, the Crown Lands Office and Survey Department merged under his supervision.

In February, 1866, Halloran was appointed the under-secretary in the Colonial Secretary's Department by Henry Parkes. A year later, Parkes appointed Halloran a justice of the peace. In 1867 and 1873, Halloran was involved in making arrangements for significant events such as welcoming the Duke of Edinburgh and the public funeral of William Charles Wentworth.

For five years [1875 to 1880], Halloran was a N.S.W. commissioner for exhibitions in Philadelphia, Melbourne, Paris and Sydney. After 1878, Halloran was made a Companion of the Order of St Michael and St George (C.M.G.) and retired with a pension. He set up as a land agent but shortly after, he retired.

Career as Poet 
From the 1840s, Halloran's verses could be found in magazines and newspapers, and he became included in Sydney's literary circles. He was known for supporting and encouraging young writers, even reportedly finding Henry Kendall a job in the Colonial Secretary's Department.

Daniel Deniehy often praised Halloran's verses as “remarkable for their classic grace” and for their “manly gentleness”. He also reportedly said that Halloran held “the truest title to the rank of poet”. Halloran also made translations of the Greek poems of Anacreon.

After he retired from the public servant life, he chose to write poetry at his home in Mowbray, Ashfield. Halloran's later poetry, written for special occasions, often revealed his loyalty to the throne. These poems were not well received and were considered unimaginative and conventional. Halloran published [in 1887] Poems, Odes and Songs and [in 1890] A Few Love Rhymes of a Married Life.

Personal life 
Halloran's first marriage was in 1841 to Elizabeth Henrietta, the daughter of Joseph Underwood, with whom he had eight children, four boys and four girls before she died in 1889. He was later married a second time to Julia Margaret Guerin on 29 June 1891 and had one son with her.

Death 
On 19 May 1893, Halloran died at Ashfield. He was buried in St John's Church of England cemetery. His funeral was attended by, amongst other officials, Henry Parkes.

Bibliography 
 The Discovery of Eastern Australia and The Unveiling the Captain Cook Statue (1879) (Note: This title is correct as per the published volume.) 
 Prize Poems on the International Exhibition of New South Wales, 1879 (1879)
 Poems, Odes, Songs (1887)
 A Few Love Rhymes of a Married Life (1890)
 Two Early Poems of 1833 (1977)

See also 
 Laurence Halloran, father
 Henry Halloran, grandson
 Julia Margaret Guerin, second wife

Further reading 
Halloran Family Papers, 13 September 1818-21 May 1884

Laurence Halloran – genealogical papers, 1890-1998, mainly concerning the Halloran family

Additional material, including original manuscripts, correspondence, and photographs, held at The State Library of NSW

References

External links

 

1811 births
1893 deaths
19th-century Australian poets
South African emigrants to Australia